The Ellis Building is a historic commercial building at 208 North Block Avenue in Fayetteville, Arkansas.  It is a single-story  brick building, with a hip roof that has a rounded top section.  The roof's shape is obscured from the front by a low stepped parapet.  The front facade has a former garage bay opening to the left, and a pair of plate glass display windows flanking a pedestrian entrance to the right.  The building was under construction about 1923, and is one of the oldest surviving automotive service buildings in northwestern Arkansas.  It has housed a variety of commercial businesses since ending automotive use about 1955.

The building was listed on the National Register of Historic Places in 2019.

See also
National Register of Historic Places listings in Washington County, Arkansas

References

Gas stations on the National Register of Historic Places in Arkansas
Buildings and structures completed in 1923
National Register of Historic Places in Fayetteville, Arkansas
1923 establishments in Arkansas